This is a list of prisons within Shandong province of the People's Republic of China.

Sources 

Buildings and structures in Shandong
Shandong